Ozzy's Boneyard (formerly The Boneyard) is a radio station featuring a classic rock/hard rock format on Sirius XM Radio channel 38 and Dish Network 6019.

The station was the home of The Rock of Jericho, hosted by WWE wrestler Chris Jericho, until its cancellation in December 2006. The Rock of Jericho episodes continue to be re-run on sister channel Octane. Eddie Trunk started hosting a four-hour show on The Boneyard in December 2006.

In February 2012, Sirius/XM partnered with Sharon Osbourne to relaunch The Boneyard, rebranding it Ozzy's Boneyard. Trunk was dropped as host; he said Osbourne had some unspecified but long-running disagreement with him. Osbourne never allowed her husband Ozzy Osbourne to appear on That Metal Show or to be interviewed by Trunk.

Core artists
AC/DC
Metallica
Van Halen
Ozzy Osbourne
Black Sabbath
Judas Priest
Iron Maiden
Rush
Dio
Guns N' Roses
Motörhead

References

External links
SiriusXM: Boneyard

XM Satellite Radio channels
Sirius Satellite Radio channels
Sirius XM Radio channels
Radio stations established in 2001
Radio stations established in 2009